JKLM Games was a board game publishing company based in the United Kingdom.  The company was placed into voluntary liquidation on March 10, 2010.

Published games
, JKLM games has published:
1860: Railways on the Isle of Wight, an 18XX game designed by Mike Hutton
Celtic Quest designed by Nigel Buckle
City and Guilds designed by Steve Kingsbury
Constellation designed by Hans van Halteren
Dwarves designed by Markus Welbourne
Fruit Bandits designed by Ian Vincent
Hive designed by John Yianni
Junkyard Races designed by John Yianni
Kings Progress designed by Steve Kingsbury
Media Mogul designed by Richard Huzzey
Kogge designed by Andreas Steding
On the Underground designed by Sebastian Bleasdale, co-published with Rio Grande Games
 Third World Debt designed by Dave Thorby
Tulipmania designed by Scott Nicholson
Whisky Race designed by Andreas Steding
 Presidential Election designed by Richard Huzzey

References

External links 
 
 

Board game publishing companies